The 2014–15 season was the 75th season of Wisła Kraków in the Ekstraklasa.

Season review

Squad

Transfers

Summer transfer window

Arrivals 
 The following players moved to Wisła.

Departures 
 The following players moved from Wisła.

Winter transfer window

Arrivals 
 The following players moved to Wisła.

Departures 
 The following players moved from Wisła.

Competitions

Friendlies

Ekstraklasa

Regular season

Results summary

Results by round

Matches

League table

Championship round

Results summary

Results by round

Matches

League table

Polish Cup

Squad statistics

Appearances and goals

|-
|}

Goalscorers

Assists

Disciplinary record

References

Wisła Kraków seasons
Wisla Krakow